Joseph Kimani (September 1, 1972 – November 1, 2012) was a Kenyan long-distance runner who competed over 10,000 metres on the track and in road running competitions.

In his native country, he was commonly referred to as "KK" for Kimani Karanja. In other parts of the world, he was king of the road. He was the Superstar of most road races in the 1990s. He won 11 of the 13 road races in one  season and finished second in 2 of them.

Track career
Kimani finished 6th in the 10000 metres at the 1995 World Championships in Athletics.

Road running career
In 1996 at the Peachtree Road Race Kimani set the world record 10k run at 27:04.

Kimani finished 21st at the 1998 IAAF World Half Marathon Championships and 4th at the 2000 IAAF World Half Marathon Championships.

In 1996, Kimani won the 10 kilometre Vancouver Sun Run with a record breaking time of 27:31.

Death
Kimani died of pneumonia on November 1, 2012.

References

External links

1972 births
Kenyan male long-distance runners
2012 deaths
World Athletics Championships athletes for Kenya
Kenyan male cross country runners
20th-century Kenyan people
21st-century Kenyan people